Szczuczyn is a town in Podlaskie Voivodeship in north-eastern Poland.

Szczuczyn may also refer to:
 Szczuczyn, Greater Poland Voivodeship (west-central Poland)
 Szczuczyn Litewski, Polish name for Shchuchyn in modern Belarus